Ademola Lookman Olajade Alade Aylola Lookman (born 20 October 1997) is a professional footballer who plays as a winger for  club Atalanta and the Nigeria national team.

Lookman made his senior debut in 2015, playing as a forward for Charlton Athletic of the Championship, and in January 2017 signed for Everton, who used him mainly as a winger. He has represented England from under-19 to under-21 levels. In 2022, Lookman received clearance from FIFA to represent Nigeria.

Early life
Lookman was born in Wandsworth, South West London to Nigerian parents. He attended St Thomas the Apostle College in Peckham where he achieved three A*s and five As at GCSE.

Club career

Charlton Athletic

Lookman joined Charlton Athletic's academy in 2014 after signing from Waterloo, a youth football club based in the London Borough of Lambeth. His goalscoring record for Charlton's U18 and U21 teams led to him making a rapid ascent through the Charlton academy ranks and he made his first-team debut for the Addicks on 3 November 2015. He scored his first goal for the club in a 3–2 defeat at Brighton & Hove Albion on 5 December 2015, and then followed that up with both Charlton's goals in a 2–2 draw with Bolton Wanderers ten days later.

Everton
Lookman signed a four-and-a-half-year contract with Everton on 5 January 2017 for an undisclosed fee, reported as an initial £7.5m potentially rising to £11m with add-ons. He made his debut for the club ten days later in a 4–0 victory over Manchester City, replacing Ross Barkley in the 90th minute and scoring the team's fourth goal. Lookman made his first European appearance for Everton in a 1–0 win over MFK Ružomberok in the Europa League third qualifying round first leg.

Although manager Sam Allardyce stated that Lookman would not be leaving on loan in the January 2018 transfer window, the club eventually arranged a loan move to Championship club Derby County, where they hoped he would play regular first-team football. However, the player insisted on an alternative move, and instead joined Bundesliga club RB Leipzig until the end of the 2017–18 season. In his first game with Leipzig, Lookman scored the winning goal in the away game against Borussia Mönchengladbach after coming on as a late substitute.

RB Leipzig
On 25 July 2019, Lookman returned to RB Leipzig on a five-year contract.

On 30 September 2020, Lookman joined Premier League side Fulham on a season-long loan. He scored his first league goal for Fulham against Sheffield United on 18 October.

On 31 August 2021, Lookman joined Leicester City on a season-long loan. On 11 September 2021, he made his Leicester debut as a 73rd minute substitute during a 1–0 defeat to Manchester City. On 28 December 2021, Lookman scored the only goal in their 1–0 win over Liverpool.

Atalanta
On 4 August 2022, Lookman joined Serie A club Atalanta on a four-year contract for a reported fee of €15 million. He scored on his debut for the club, a 2–0 Serie A win over Sampdoria on 13 August. In January 2023, he scored braces in three consecutive matches: a 8–2 Serie A win over Salernitana, a 5–2 Coppa Italia win over Spezia and a 3–3 Serie A draw to Juventus.

International career
Lookman was born in England to Nigerian parents, and is eligible for the national teams of both countries. He received his first international call-up when he was named in the England U19 squad named for Mexico. He was subsequently named in the squad for the European U19 Championships that summer. In early 2017, Lookman turned down the opportunity to switch allegiance to Nigeria after an approach from the national coach, Gernot Rohr.

Lookman was selected in the England under-20 team for the 2017 FIFA U-20 World Cup. He scored three goals in the tournament, two against Costa Rica in the last 16 and one goal against Italy in the semi-finals. England beat Venezuela 1–0 in the final, to achieve the country's first victory in the final of a global tournament since the 1966 World Cup.

He received his first call-up for the England under-21s for European Championship qualifiers against the Netherlands under-21s and Latvia under-21s in September 2017. He made his debut in the first match, and set up Everton teammate Dominic Calvert-Lewin for England's goal in a 1–1 draw.

Lookman turned down Nigeria again in early 2018 after meeting with the president of the Nigeria Football Federation. He subsequently rejected Nigeria's approaches for a third time in September 2018, after England senior manager Gareth Southgate convinced him that he was part of his plans.

Despite his caps and success for England at youth level, and having previously rejected Nigeria's approaches, in January 2020 the Nigeria Football Federation announced that Lookman would be switching his international allegiance to Nigeria. However, Lookman also stated: "I've not changed my mind on wanting to represent England". On 10 February 2022, Lookman's request to represent the Nigerian national team was approved by FIFA. Lookman made his debut for Nigeria on 25 March 2022, in their scoreless draw with Ghana as part of the third round of the African section of qualification for the 2022 FIFA World Cup.

Career statistics

Club

International

Scores and results list Nigeria's goal tally first, score column indicates score after each Lookman goal

Honours
England U20
FIFA U-20 World Cup: 2017

Individual
LFE Apprentice of the Year (Championship): 2015–16

References

External links

Profile at the Atalanta B.C. website

1997 births
Living people
Footballers from Wandsworth
English footballers
Nigerian footballers
Association football wingers
Charlton Athletic F.C. players
Everton F.C. players
RB Leipzig players
Fulham F.C. players
Leicester City F.C. players
Atalanta B.C. players
English Football League players
Premier League players
Bundesliga players
Serie A players
England youth international footballers
England under-21 international footballers
Nigeria international footballers
English expatriate footballers
Nigerian expatriate footballers
Expatriate footballers in Germany
Expatriate footballers in Italy
English expatriate sportspeople in Germany
English expatriate sportspeople in Italy
Nigerian expatriate sportspeople in Germany
Nigerian expatriate sportspeople in Italy
Black British sportspeople
English sportspeople of Nigerian descent